Sven Erik Kristiansen (born 4 February 1969) is a Norwegian musician, best known as the former vocalist in the black metal band Mayhem under the stage name Maniac.

With Mayhem 

Kristiansen joined Mayhem in 1986 after the departure of the band's original vocalist Messiah and left in 1988, he was then replaced by Dead, who was later replaced by Kittil after Dead's suicide in 1991. When Hellhammer decided to revive Mayhem in 1995 after the deaths of both Euronymous and Dead and the imprisonment of Count Grishnakh, he invited Maniac to return as the band's vocalist.

He was known for giving extremely intense live performances and would often cut himself onstage, frequently landing him in intensive care units. However, in a later interview Kristiansen stated "...when we realized that the cutting had become a phenomenon people came to watch, I quit doing it." He has also stated that the coverage Mayhem has received is disproportionate.

Kristiansen was in the band until 2004 when he was asked to leave due to his erratic behavior. In the only press release about the split, he also cited lack of time as being a vital factor.  In 2016 Kristensen briefly rejoined Mayhem onstage during the Inferno Festival in Oslo, Norway.

Personal life 

Kristiansen has three children: a daughter with his wife, Eri Isaka (aka Vivian Slaughter), a son with his ex-girlfriend, Hilma, and a daughter from a previous relationship.  He has said that since he became a father, he has become more conscious of what he exposes himself to and is less destructive.

For several years, Kristiansen was a self-admitted alcoholic. According to him, the turning point was one day when he found himself hanging by one arm out of a fourth floor window, with no idea how he got there.  He is married to Vivian Slaughter, bassist and vocalist for the now defunct Japanese band Gallhammer.

Discography 
Mayhem
 Deathcrush (1987) (EP)
 Wolf's Lair Abyss (1997) (EP)
 Mediolanum Capta Est (1999) (live album)
 Grand Declaration of War (2000) (studio album)
 European Legions (2001) (compilation)
 Chimera (2004) (studio album)
 Atavistic Black Disorder / Kommando (2021) (guest vocals on 1 track)

Skitliv
Kristiansen and Kvarforth Swim in the Sea of Equilibrium While Waiting (2007) (demo)
Amfetamin (MCD) (2008) (EP)
Skandinavisk misantropi (2009) (studio album)

References 

1969 births
Living people
Mayhem (band) members
Norwegian black metal musicians
Norwegian rock singers
Norwegian heavy metal singers
Black metal singers
Punk rock singers
Norwegian male singers
Norwegian multi-instrumentalists
Place of birth missing (living people)